Academia Cațavencu ("The Cațavencu Academy") is a Romanian satirical magazine founded in 1991 and made famous by its investigative journalism. Academia Cațavencu also owns Radio Guerrilla , an FM radio station with national coverage ; Tabu, a women's magazine, Superbebe, a magazine for new parents, Aventuri la pescuit, a magazine for fishermen, 24-FUN, a free magazine for teenagers, and Cotidianul, a daily newspaper.

In a surprise move, on May 29, 2006, Academia Cațavencu press group announced it was being acquired  by Realitatea Media, owners of Realitatea TV, and controlled by controversial and elusive businessman Sorin Ovidiu Vântu. Vântu himself has often been a target of enquiries by Cațavencu journalists.

Name
Nae Cațavencu is a character in Ion Luca Caragiale's 1883 comedy O scrisoare pierdută ("A Lost Letter"). An unscrupulous, demagogue politician, Cațavencu uses his newspaper Răcnetul Carpaților ("The Yell of the Carpathians") to blackmail politicians of the opposing party with a compromising love letter that he finds.

History
In its current form, Academia Cațavencu was founded in 1991, by a team of humourists, investigators, and literates headed by poet and former dissident Mircea Dinescu. Part of the team had previously edited two short-lived satirical papers, Cațavencu Incomod and Cațavencu Internațional.

Dinescu was editor-in-chief until 1998, when he resigned and went on to create his own publications, Aspirina săracului ("The poor man's aspirin" - a joking reference to sexual intercourse), and Plai cu boi (Land of the Dumb), a monthly satirical magazine parodying the style of Playboy.

Current activities

Academia Cațavencu have been long-time press freedom advocates. They maintain a "press monitoring agency", a watchdog against manipulation through mass-media.

During the 2004 election campaign, Academia Cațavencu published as supplements two parody issues of Scânteia (the old-time Romanian Communist Party newspaper), containing reprints of articles written by important current day politicians during the Communist era. Almost 40,000 copies were bought in bulk from newsagents, along with other newspapers . The alleged perpetrators were representatives of the then-governing Social Democratic Party (PSD), whose (mostly former Communist) high members (including founder and former President of Romania Ion Iliescu) were protagonists of the Cațavencu special issues.

Apart from political issues, Academia Cațavencu organises and/or sponsors a number of cultural and environmental initiatives:
 Save the Danube Delta
 Save Vama Veche
 Cu papucii prin deșert ("Across the Desert in slippers", a reference to the Dacia car hatchback model) - a humanitarian expedition through the Sahara and down to Senegal

They also develop their own stereotypes and nicknames of the politicians, such as:
 Ion Iliescu "Nelu Cotrocelu" or "Bunicuța" ("The Granny") - associated with the Cotroceni Palace owl
 Adrian Năstase "Bombonel" ("Candy Boy") - in reference to his alleged homosexuality
 Traian Băsescu "Popeye Marinarul" ("Popeye the Sailor") - due to Băsescu's former job as a commercial navy captain
 Theodor Stolojan "The robot", "Robocop" or "Frankie" - due to his voice and comic resemblance to the classic image of Frankenstein's monster
 Petre Roman - suggests that he is rather popular among the female workers of the APACA textile factory in Bucharest (whom they reported shouting once: Nu vrem bani! Nu vrem valută! Vrem pe Roman să ne fută! ("We don't want money! We don't want hard currency! We want Roman to fuck us!").
 Gheorghe Dumitrașcu - suggests that he washes infrequently
 Nicolae Văcăroiu "Votcăroiu" - allegedly heavy drinker of "Săniuța", a low-grade brand of vodka (votcă)
 Șerban Mihăilescu "Miki Șpagă" ("Mickey Bribe") - corruption allegations
 Marian Vanghelie - he has poor grammatical skills, as coined by Vanghelie's frequent and indiscriminate use of Care este ("Which is"), as a predicate for singular and plural subjects alike.

See also
 Le Canard enchaîné, a French counterpart
 The Clinic, a Chilean counterpart
 Frank, a Canadian counterpart
 El Jueves, a Spanish counterpart
 Moskovskaya Komsomolka, a Russian counterpart
 NJUZ, a Serbian counterpart
 Noseweek, a South African counterpart
 The Onion, a US counterpart
 Private Eye, a British counterpart
 The Phoenix, an Irish counterpart
 Titanic, a German counterpart

See also
 List of magazines in Romania

References

External links
 Academia Cațavencu

1991 establishments in Romania
Satirical magazines published in Romania
Magazines established in 1991
Magazines published in Bucharest
Romanian-language magazines
Political magazines published in Romania
Weekly magazines published in Romania
Romanian political satire